Peschany is a rural locality (a Posyolok) in Kolsky District of Murmansk Oblast, Russia. The village is located beyond the Arctic circle, on the Kola Peninsula.  It is the birthplace of Igor Prasolov, a former Ukrainian Minister of Economic Development and Trade.

References

Rural localities in Murmansk Oblast